Platte County is a county located in the U.S. state of Wyoming. As of the 2020 United States Census, the population was 8,605. Its county seat is Wheatland.

History
Platte County was created February 21, 1911 with land detached from Laramie County and organized in 1913. The county was named for the North Platte River, which flows through the northeastern part of the county.

Geography
It is the third-smallest county in Wyoming by area.

Adjacent counties

Niobrara County (northeast)
Goshen County (east)
Laramie County (south)
Albany County (west)
Converse County (northwest)

National protected area
Medicine Bow National Forest (part)

Major Highways

 Interstate 25
 U.S. Highway 26
 U.S. Highway 87
 Wyoming Highway 34

Demographics

2000 census
As of the 2000 United States Census, there were 8,807 people, 3,625 households, and 2,494 families in the county. The population density was 4 people per square mile (2/km2). There were 4,528 housing units at an average density of 2 per square mile (1/km2). The racial makeup of the county was 96.18% White, 0.16% Black or African American, 0.50% Native American, 0.17% Asian, 0.02% Pacific Islander, 1.69% from other races, and 1.27% from two or more races. 5.28% of the population were Hispanic or Latino of any race. 31.7% were of German, 13.4% Irish, 11.3% English and 7.5% American ancestry.

There were 3,625 households, out of which 30.00% had children under the age of 18 living with them, 58.90% were married couples living together, 6.80% had a female householder with no husband present, and 31.20% were non-families. 27.30% of all households were made up of individuals, and 13.20% had someone living alone who was 65 years of age or older. The average household size was 2.40 and the average family size was 2.92.

The county population contained 25.40% under the age of 18, 6.60% from 18 to 24, 24.30% from 25 to 44, 27.30% from 45 to 64, and 16.60% who were 65 years of age or older. The median age was 41 years. For every 100 females there were 97.40 males. For every 100 females age 18 and over, there were 96.50 males.

The median income for a household in the county was $33,866, and the median income for a family was $41,449. Males had a median income of $31,484 versus $19,635 for females. The per capita income for the county was $17,530. About 8.50% of families and 11.70% of the population were below the poverty line, including 15.90% of those under age 18 and 12.20% of those age 65 or over.

2010 census
As of the 2010 United States Census, there were 8,667 people, 3,838 households, and 2,505 families in the county. The racial makeup of the county was 95.4% white, 0.4% Asian, 0.4% American Indian, 0.3% black or African American, 0.1% Pacific islander, 2.0% from other races, and 1.5% from two or more races. Those of Hispanic or Latino origin made up 6.7% of the population. In terms of ancestry, 45.3% were German, 21.1% were English, 17.3% were Irish, and 6.2% were American.

Of the 3,838 households, 24.5% had children under the age of 18 living with them, 54.9% were married couples living together, 6.9% had a female householder with no husband present, 34.7% were non-families, and 30.6% of all households were made up of individuals. The average household size was 2.23 and the average family size was 2.76. The median age was 47.5 years.

The median income for a household in the county was $42,947 and the median income for a family was $51,759. Males had a median income of $55,757 versus $29,366 for females. The per capita income for the county was $24,185. About 6.1% of families and 10.3% of the population were below the poverty line, including 18.2% of those under age 18 and 3.5% of those age 65 or over.

Communities

Towns

 Chugwater
 Glendo
 Guernsey
 Hartville
 Wheatland (county seat)

Census-designated places

 Chugcreek
 El Rancho
 Lakeview North
 Slater
 Westview Circle
 Y-O Ranch
 Whiting

Unincorporated communities

 Bordeaux
 Diamond
 Dwyer
 Dwyer Junction
 Uva
 Wendover

Ghost towns
 Sunrise

Notable people
Larry Birleffi, the "Voice of the University of Wyoming Cowboys"
Jim Geringer, governor of Wyoming
Robert Mills Grant, Wyoming State Representative
Harold Hellbaum, Wyoming State Representative and Speaker of the House

Politics
Platte County voters have been reliably Republican for decades. In only two national elections since 1940 has the county selected the Democratic Party candidate (as of 2020).

See also
National Register of Historic Places listings in Platte County, Wyoming
Wyoming
List of cities and towns in Wyoming
List of counties in Wyoming
Wyoming statistical areas

References

External links

 
 Those who died from Platte County during World War II

 
1913 establishments in Wyoming
Populated places established in 1913